"Fools Hall of Fame" is a song by Pat Boone that reached number 29 on the Bllboard Hot 100 in 1959.

Track listing

Charts

References 

1959 songs
1959 singles
Pat Boone songs
Dot Records singles